OVS (Ontario Varrio Sur and also known as Onterio Varrio Sunkist) is a Mexican American (Chicano) gang from Ontario, California.

Culture 
OVS has a long history of involvement with the Mexican Mafia.

OVS Gang colors are black and white. Their dress attire includes Baltimore Orioles hats, using the "O" to represent Ontario and Boston Red Sox team attire.

Criminal activity 
Community hero and Ontario Police Detective Brice Devey serves as a veteran officer with the Ontario Gang unit with many years of experience working with the OVS gang. He clearly states that the primary activity of the OVS gang is murder.

Along with repeated activities such as robberies, assaults and narcotics sales. This information is also based on his personal experiences and certified documents with his many years with the O.P.D. Gang unit.

OVS is notorious for their participation in hate crimes against African Americans in their neighborhoods. OVS main source of income is from illegal narcotics and gun trafficking. OVS, as with most other Sureño gangs, are well connected with Mexican drug cartels, specifically the Sinaloa cartel. Methamphetamine, cocaine, black-tar heroin, and marijuana are sold by street dealers who operate out of numerous hidden "trap-houses" where the product is stored and processed into smaller quantities. OVS also sells arsenals of illegal/stolen firearms, ranging from handguns to assault rifles, as well as knives, clubs, and other weapons.

Timeline

1954 
The OVS Earth Angels are formed, with their original territory starting in south Ontario.

1980 
Northside Ontario Calaveras street gang forms. In one incident in 1999, Northside Ontario Calaveras gang members were targeted in a shooting by members of Eastside Ontario 4th street YGW gang.

1990 
The OVS Earth Angels disband. Many senior members are official made members of the California Mexican mafia.

November 9, 1993 
East L.A. Benjamin "Topo" Peters (Age 54) replaces East L.A. Maravilla Joe "Peg Leg" Morgan as La Eme godfather, Peters is challenged for control of La Eme by OVS Black Angel Reuben "Tupi" Hernandez, who gains control.

January 1997 
OVS Black Angel leader Angel "Vala" Marines murders a fellow OVS Black Angel member.

June 2001 
In June 2001, Hector "Pirate" Ruben Lopez was a suspected OVS Black Angels member, with an outstanding warrant for his arrest. On June 20, 2001, Glen Willett, then a Senior Special Agent of the California Department of Corrections, received information that Lopez was located at a residence on Oakland Avenue, in Ontario, California. During surveillance, Willett and Ontario Police Department ("OPD") officers observed Lopez's mother and brother, Joe "Joker" Martel, enter the Oakland Avenue residence. Martel was a known OVS Black Angel gang member who was also on parole. Through a window in the door, Willett saw Lopez "peek around the corner from a hallway. Willett ordered Lopez to open the door, but Lopez disappeared down the hallway out of sight. A few minutes after Willett and the OPD officers unsuccessfully tried to force entry, Lopez opened the door and was arrested a few feet outside the front door. The officers conducted a protective sweep of the residence, forcing entry into a back bedroom. In the hallway bathroom toilet, officers found an empty clear plastic baggy. After the residence was secured, the officers conducted a parole search of the residence. During the parole search, officers found plastic baggies containing methamphetamine and three handguns.

On June 27, 2001, Bureau of Alcohol, Tobacco, Firearms, and Explosives Special Agent David Silva requested federal prosecution of Lopez. Behnke accepted the case for prosecution pending further investigation, and opened a case file for Lopez on July 5, 2001.

In late September 2001, FBI Special Agent Volk interviewed Lopez, for a second time, about Lopez's knowledge of the OVS Black Angels, and advised Lopez that he "could be looking at serious federal time" unless he cooperated. Lopez refused to cooperate. Lopez was thereafter indicted by a federal grand jury for being a felon in knowing possession of firearms, in violation of 18 U.S.C. § 924(c), and for possession of methamphetamine with intent to distribute.

Lopez pled guilty to possession of methamphetamine with intent to distribute, reserving the right to appeal the denial of his motions to dismiss and suppress. Lopez was sentenced to 169 months in prison.

January 20, 2005 
OVS rival gang members Henry Valle, 18, and Narisco Perez, 18, are found shot dead in a minivan in the 4200 block of Los Serranos Boulevard in Chino Hills. Valle had mistakenly burglarized a home connected to Darryl Castrejon one of the top Mexican Mafia enforcers and southern California shot-caller with ties to the Pomona's 12th Street gang.

April 2006 
OVS LA Eme members Darryl Castrejon, Arthur Garcia, Julio Ponce Felix Jr. and Ricardo Polanco are arrested for conspiracy to commit murder against a fellow La Eme member "Frankie Buelna". They are included with the 57 Gang Members arrested from the Pomona Sharkies. With a seizure of more than six pounds of methamphetamine worth nearly $36,000, 18 pounds of methamphetamine ice worth $162,000, 36 grams of heroin, 14 grams of cocaine, more than $23,000 in U.S. currency, 11 pistols, several rifles and shotguns, and one grenade.  In addition, during the arrests agents seized nine more pounds of methamphetamine, one-half pound of heroin, 25 firearms, including an AK-47 and approximately $20,000 in U.S. currency.  The investigation included the use of wiretaps, informants, extensive surveillance, and undercover agents.

2006-2007 
The Gangland TV series approached members from the OVS gang for an episode. The TV series was aware of their power struggle in the California Mexican mafia as well as with the leadership and influence that OVS carries in the prison system and on the streets of southern California.

September 2008 
OVS gang member Cesar Albert Mora was sentenced to 58 years to life.

January 7th 2009 
OVS La Eme member Darryl Castrejon failed to appear at a scheduled court hearing in Pomona Superior Court for the first time in three years, three days before the Frankie B murder plot trial. Castrejon posted a $1 million bail and fled custody.

July 30th, 2009 
OVS gang member Andrew Magallanez was convicted of murder and attempted murder.

April 21st, 2010 
A 17-month investigation spearheaded by the Ontario Police Department resulted in the arrest of 52 alleged gang members who had ties to the Mexican Mafia. Ontario police officers said the gang investigation was the largest in the city's history.

About 400 law-enforcement officers participated with the Ontario Police department with the support of the DEA, the U.S. Attorney's Office and surrounding law-enforcement agencies. Officers went to 34 locations in Riverside, San Bernardino and Los Angeles counties to serve search and arrest warrants. Only seventeen of those were in Ontario. The arrests included more than 60 federal indictments as well as the seizure of firearms, methamphetamine and $168,000 in cash.

A joint federal-state law enforcement operation led to the arrest of the OVS gang members and associates who are also named in federal racketeering and narcotics indictments. The arrests were the result of the indictments returned by a federal grand jury in Los Angeles. The main indictment names total of 52 defendants, 36 of whom are charged under the Racketeer Influenced Corrupt Organizations (RICO) Act. A second indictment charges another 10 defendants with narcotics trafficking violations.

November 8, 2010 
OVS gang member Frank Martin Hernandez, 33, entered a plea bargain with prosecutors that carries a 35-year prison sentence.

January 2011 
OVS gang member Daniel Vera was found guilty of first-degree murder for shooting a man that prosecutors described as a gang member "green-lit" by his gang for execution. The jury also convicted Vera of participation in a criminal street gang, as well as two special allegations – that Vera used a firearm and committed the killing in association with a gang.

May 2011 
Two OVS gang members, Joseph Arrez, 31 and Johniennie Flores, 29, kill a man and are charged with murder, carjacking, and participating in a criminal street gang.

October 2011 
OVS gang member Avid Joseph Aviles, 36 was arrested and convicted for attempted murder. In addition to the attempted murder charges, Aviles was arrested for a parole violation.

September 2011 
OVS gang member Tony Reyes Martinez gets in a shootout with Ontario police.

May 2012 
OVS Black Angel leader Thomas "Night Owl" murders an OVS fellow Black Angel member.

August 2012 
The OVS Gang along with the Pomona Sharkey's Gang and several other SGV gangs are targeted as a Narcotics Distribution Network, Including Members of an International Drug Trafficking Organization. An investigation by the San Gabriel Valley Safe Streets Task Force resulted in the arrest of 27 defendants who face federal narcotics charges for their roles in a methamphetamine distribution network. A federal grand jury returned an indictment in U.S. District Court in Los Angeles charging a total of 27 defendants, several of whom were already in custody. The indictment outlines hundreds of overt acts that formed the basis for the conspiracy to manufacture, possess, and distribute large quantities of nearly pure methamphetamine. The indictment charges the defendants for their roles in the distribution of methamphetamine, the possession with the intent to distribute methamphetamine; for conspiring to manufacture, possess with intent to distribute, and distribution of methamphetamine; and maintaining drug-involved premises, all violations of the United States Code, Title 21.

May 14th, 2013 
OVS gang members Danny Ray Contreras and James Edward Hall shot and killed a fellow OVS gang member that was "greenlit". Both were convicted of first degree murder, gun-use enhancements and a gang enhancement. Both were sentenced to life.

2014 
OVS La Eme leaders Armando "Mando" Barajas of Pomona and Juan "Nito" Gil — was convicted of violations of the Racketeer Influenced Corrupt Organizations (RICO) Act, as well as allegations of violent crimes in aid of racketeering, conspiring to distribute heroin and methamphetamine, and firearms violations. A federal jury convicted the pair following a nine-day trial, according to a news release from the U.S. Attorney's Office. The lead defendant Barajas, 50, was accused of controlling the gang's activities, including the narcotics distribution activities in the gang's territory. Juan "Nito" Gil, 43, serving a 10-year prison term when he was indicted in 2010 – was also found guilty of exercising control of gang activities by communicating directions through others linked to the gang.

February 20, 2015 
OVS gang members Carlos "Chino" Rivera, Raul "Crook" Prieto, and Jessica Medina attempts to appeal their jury convictions arising out of activities connected with the OVS Black Angels, Prieto objects to the admission of testimony from Black Angels gang leader David Navarro regarding the meaning of the term "bird" and argues that the prosecution mischaracterized Navarro's testimony in its closing argument. However, Navarro's testimony was admissible as a lay opinion supported by his experience as the leader of the gang's extortion activities and participation in methamphetamine sales. The evidence is sufficient to allow a rational fact finder to convict Prieto based on the distribution of methamphetamine. The recorded telephone calls demonstrate Prieto's willingness to sell half an ounce of a larger supply of a controlled substance. Prieto never questioned Rivera regarding what type of drugs Rivera was expecting when he "re-upped," allowing for a reasonable inference that Prieto understood Rivera's reference. This inference is bolstered by Navarro's testimony that Rivera had conducted methamphetamine deals from Prieto's mother's house in Prieto's presence and with Prieto's knowledge, demonstrating that Prieto knew that Rivera trafficked in methamphetamine. Finally, Rivera was arrested with nearly half a pound of high-purity methamphetamine following his conversation with Prieto. Because a conviction can be proven through circumstantial evidence and inferences drawn from that evidence, and because a reasonable fact finder could conclude that Prieto knew Rivera was distributing methamphetamine and that Prieto was requesting half an ounce of methamphetamine to sell. Prieto's argument failed.

February 2020 to Present 
OVS and other San Bernardino county gangs along with the San Gabriel Valley gangs (the surenos alliance) heightens their Mexican Mafia orders and agrees on terrorizing and killing African Americans (Crips, Bloods, etc.) in their territories.

As of today the Inland Empire and SGV sureno gangs continues to war with the black gangs pushing them further down south pass Riverside county. In retaliation many African American gangs are killing young Latinos in their teens in the Inland Empire.

September 2019 
OVS gang member Ulises Ortega evades Ontario Police department in south Ontario leaving OVS gang members Tara S. and David "Bam Bam" Olivares SUV on west Sunkist. Ulises Ortega discards a hand gun while evading Ontario police department in the yard of Joseph Z. A self admitted Pomona 12th street member who lives on west Park street in south Ontario. Joseph Z. contacts Ontario police department and allows them to come into his home and gives them the hand gun while cooperating with O.P.D. 3 months later Ulises Ortega is charged with two counts of evading police and possession of a firearm by a felon with gang enhancements.

High ranking members

Tupi Hernandez 
A veteran of OVS (Sunkist St-Black Angels), Tupi joined La Eme during one of the frequent trips behind bars he made during his late teens. Tupi, along with his best friend Tito Marines, led OVS in battle against other well-established surrounding gangs.

Tupi's devotion and eagerness to please his superiors in La Eme led him to become known as one of the most dangerous inmates in the California prison system – a designation he would prove when his buddy Marines was killed while he served an 8-year sentence for robbery. Upon his release, Tupi promptly returned to his old haunts where he chastised the younger members of OVS for failing to take care of business, meaning kill a list of people he had passed down through the "prison information network" before his release. Prime on his list of people to kill was Mary Lou Davila Salazar, the woman he deemed responsible for Marines' murder. During a series of meetings with the most promising Eme recruits from OVS, Tupi warned the youngsters to stay off of the street Salazar lived on, and secured an arsenal of weapons to complete his mission of revenge. In an event which shocked the city of Ontario, Tupi entered Salazar's house on the morning of June 22, 1987 and savagely beat and executed not only Salazar, but also her young roommate and her boyfriend.

Darryl "Dashing D" Castrejon 
One of the top leaders of the OVS family and one of the Mexican Mafia top leaders in California, Darryl Castrejon's leadership and influence as an enforcer has spawned a new breed of generational top notched soldiers and new recruits for La Eme throughout California. This silent, observant, untouchable leader from OVS is known to have major influences with southern California gangs, thus making OVS an untouchable ally within the Sureno network.

Ambassador of the OVS La Eme and shot caller of the OVS Black Angels.

See also 
 Surenos
 Mexican Mafia
 California Street Gangs

References 

Organizations established in the 1940s
1940s establishments in California
Sureños
Latino street gangs
Gangs in California
Gangs in Los Angeles
Mexican-American culture in California
Ontario, California